Austropotamobius bihariensis is a species of crayfish in the family Astacidae. It is known to exist only in Romania being restricted to the rivers in the western Apuseni Mountains. Its proposed English common name is idle crayfish. It is supposed to have diverged/split ~15 Ma old from a common relative of A. torrentium from the Dinarides and evolved isolated due to the historically tectonic north-eastern movement of Tisza-Dacia mega-unit (including the Apuseni Mountains) through the Pannonian Basin, during the Miocene. The molecular divergence in 582 base length nucleotides of COI mtDNA sequences is supported by 43 mutational steps, a differentiation of 7.4% from the sister clade of A. torrentium located in north-western Dinarides

Description 
This crayfish strongly resembles its close relative A. torrentium. The individuals, not longer than 10 cm, are brown dorsally, showing lighter colors on the ventral side with hints of orange on the claws. In comparison with Austropotamobius torrentium (the stone crayfish), it has a shorter rostrum, the antennal scale is smooth without denticules and the claws are covered with tubercules that are bigger and not as many as on the stone crayfish claws.

Ecology 
European crayfish species prefer in general clean waters, but their tolerance to water pollution is variable. A. bihariensis seems to prefer cleaner and better oxygenated rivers than the stone crayfish.

Distribution 

All the populations of A. bihariensis are found in the upper sectors of Criș rivers (Crișul Alb, Crișul Negru and Crișul Repede). The holotype (deposited at the Grigore Antipa National Museum of Natural History) was collected from Damiș river, Bratca commune, Bihor county.

Conservation 
A. bihariensis populations were previously treated as A. torrentium (a threatened species, listed in the IUCN Red List and in the appendix of the Bern Convention and EU Habitats Directive. Conservation status of the idle crayfish is not assessed. Along with other crayfish species from Europe, the idle crayfish faces several threats, among which, the pressure of invasive species is very important

References 

Astacidae
Fauna of Romania
Endemic fauna of Romania